Events from the year 1830 in France.

Incumbents
 Monarch – Charles X (abdicated 2 August), Vacant (2–9 August), then Louis Philippe I (from 9 August)

Events
 July 5 - French invasion of Algiers in 1830.
 July 17 - Barthélemy Thimonnier is granted a patent (#7454) for a sewing machine. It chain stitches at 200/minute.
 July 25 - Rioting breaks out in Paris against Charles X
 July 27–29 - July Revolution ("Three Glorious Days") - people in Paris rebel against the Ordinance of St. Cloud by King Charles X of France and clash against the National Guard - 1,800 rioters and 300 soldiers die and the king has to flee the capital.
 August 2 - Abdication of King Charles X in favor of his grandson, Henry, Count of Chambord, who is not allowed to take the throne.
 August 9 - The Duke of Orleans becomes King Louis Philippe. François-René de Chateaubriand sacrifices his political career by refusing to swear an oath of allegiance to the new king and retires to write his memoirs.
 August 13 - Louis Philippe appoints the Duc de Broglie as Prime Minister.
 November 2 - Jacques Laffitte succeeds the Duc de Broglie as Prime Minister.

Arts and literature
25 February - The première of Victor Hugo's play Hernani in Paris is marked by protests from an audience who recognise it as an attack on Classicism.
c. October - Eugène Delacroix's paints Liberty Leading the People commemorating the July Revolution.
November - Publication of Stendhal's historical psychological novel The Red and the Black (Le Rouge et le Noir) in Paris.
5 December - World premiere of Hector Berlioz's most famous work, Symphonie fantastique, at the Conservatoire de Paris.

Births
23 February - Henri Meilhac, dramatist and opera librettist (died 1897)
10 April – Pierre Paul Dehérain, chemist and botanist (died 1902)
10 July - Camille Pissarro, painter (died 1903)
8 September - Frédéric Mistral, poet, shares the Nobel Prize in literature in 1904 (died 1914)
17 December - Jules de Goncourt, writer (died 1870)

Deaths
4 February - Marc Antoine de Beaumont, nobleman and soldier (born 1763)
15 February - Antoine Marie Chamans, comte de Lavalette, soldier and politician (born 1769)
17 March - Laurent, Marquis de Gouvion Saint-Cyr, marshal (born 1764)
31 July - Joseph Philippe de Clairville, botanist and entomologist (born 1742)
30 August - Louis Henri, Prince of Condé (born 1756)
7 November - Joseph Barbanègre, soldier (born 1772)
29 November - Charles Simon Catel, composer and teacher (born 1773)

See also

References

1830s in France